Phlegra is a genus of jumping spiders that was first described by Eugène Louis Simon in 1876. The name is a reference to a mythical location in both Greek and Roman mythology.

Species
 it contains seventy-nine species and one subspecies, found in Eurasia and Africa, with one species (P. hentzi) occurring only in North America:
P. abessinica Strand, 1906 – Ethiopia
P. albostriata Simon, 1901 – South Africa, Lesotho, Mozambique
P. amitaii Prószyński, 1998 – Israel
P. andreevae Logunov, 1996 – Central Asia
P. arborea Wesolowska & Haddad, 2009 – South Africa
P. atra Wesolowska & Tomasiewicz, 2008 – Ethiopia
P. bairstowi Simon, 1886 – South Africa
P. bicognata Azarkina, 2004 – Ukraine, Russia, Kazakhstan
P. bifurcata Schmidt & Piepho, 1994 – Cape Verde Is.
P. bresnieri (Lucas, 1846) – Southern Europe, Northern Africa to Turkey, Azerbaijan, Iran
Phlegra b. meridionalis Strand, 1906 – Ethiopia
P. certa Wesolowska & Haddad, 2009 – South Africa
P. chrysops Simon, 1890 – Yemen
P. cinereofasciata (Simon, 1868) – Portugal to Central Asia
P. crumena Próchniewicz & Hęciak, 1994 – Kenya
P. davidi (Caleb, Mungkung & Mathai, 2015) – India
P. desquamata Strand, 1906 – Ethiopia
P. dhakuriensis (Tikader, 1974) – Pakistan, India
P. dimentmani Prószyński, 1998 – Israel
P. dunini Azarkina, 2004 – Turkey, Azerbaijan, Iran
P. etosha Logunov & Azarkina, 2006 – Namibia, South Africa
P. fasciata (Hahn, 1826) (type) – Europe, Turkey, Caucasus, Russia to Central Asia, Iran, Afghanistan, India, China, Mongolia, Korea, Japan
P. ferberorum Prószyński, 1998 – Israel
P. flavipes Denis, 1947 – Egypt
P. fulvastra (Simon, 1868) – Italy (Sicily), Syria, Israel
P. fulvotrilineata (Lucas, 1846) – Algeria
P. gagnoa Logunov & Azarkina, 2006 – Ivory Coast
P. hentzi (Marx, 1890) – USA, Canada
P. imperiosa Peckham & Peckham, 1903 – South Africa
P. insulana Schmidt & Krause, 1998 – Cape Verde Is.
P. jacksoni Prószyński, 1998 – Israel
P. karoo Wesolowska, 2006 – Namibia, Zimbabwe, South Africa
P. kulczynskii Azarkina, 2004 – Russia, Mongolia, Kazakhstan
P. langanoensis Wesolowska & Tomasiewicz, 2008 – Ethiopia, Zimbabwe
P. levis Próchniewicz & Hęciak, 1994 – Kenya
P. levyi Prószyński, 1998 – Israel
P. lineata (C. L. Koch, 1846) – Southern Europe, Turkey, Syria, Russia (Caucasus)
P. logunovi Azarkina, 2004 – Central Asia
P. loripes Simon, 1876 – Portugal, Spain, France
P. lugubris Berland & Millot, 1941 – West Africa
P. memorialis (O. Pickard-Cambridge, 1876) – Egypt
P. micans Simon, 1901 – China (Hong Kong)
P. nitidiventris (Lucas, 1846) – Portugal, Algeria, Tunisia
P. nuda Próchniewicz & Hęciak, 1994 – Ethiopia, Kenya, Tanzania, Uganda, Zimbabwe
P. obscurimagna Azarkina, 2004 – Kyrgyzstan, Kazakhstan
P. palestinensis Logunov, 1996 – Israel
P. particeps (O. Pickard-Cambridge, 1872) – Israel to Bhutan
P. parvula Wesolowska & Russell-Smith, 2000 – Tanzania
P. pisarskii Zabka, 1985 – China, Vietnam
P. pori Prószyński, 1998 – Egypt
P. prasanna Caleb & Mathai, 2015 – India
P. procera Wesolowska & Cumming, 2008 – Zimbabwe
P. profuga Logunov, 1996 – Central Asia
P. proszynskii Zabka, 2012 – Australia (Lord Howe Is.)
P. proxima Denis, 1947 – Egypt
P. pusilla Wesolowska & van Harten, 1994 – Senegal to Zimbabwe, Yemen
P. rothi Prószyński, 1998 – Israel
P. samchiensis Prószyński, 1978 – Bhutan
P. sapphirina (Thorell, 1875) – Algeria
P. semipullata Simon, 1901 – China (Hong Kong)
P. shulovi Prószyński, 1998 – Israel
P. sierrana (Simon, 1868) – Portugal, Spain
P. simplex Wesolowska & Russell-Smith, 2000 – Tanzania, Zimbabwe
P. sogdiana Charitonov, 1946 – Central Asia
P. solitaria Wesolowska & Tomasiewicz, 2008 – Ethiopia
P. soudanica Berland & Millot, 1941 – Mali
P. stephaniae Prószyński, 1998 – Israel
P. suaverubens Simon, 1886 – Senegal
P. swanii Mushtaq, Beg & Waris, 1995 – Pakistan
P. tenella Wesolowska, 2006 – Namibia
P. tetralineata (Caporiacco, 1939) – Ethiopia, Iran
P. theseusi Logunov, 2001 – Greece (Crete)
P. thibetana Simon, 1901 – Bhutan, China
P. tillyae Prószyński, 1998 – Israel
P. touba Logunov & Azarkina, 2006 – Ivory Coast, Nigeria
P. tristis Lessert, 1927 – Congo, Kenya
P. v-epigynalis Hęciak & Prószyński, 1998 – Israel, Syria
P. varia Wesolowska & Russell-Smith, 2000 – Tanzania
P. yaelae Prószyński, 1998 – Tunisia, Israel
P. yuzhongensis Yang & Tang, 1996 – China

References

External links
 Photograph of P. bresnieri
 Photograph of P. fasciata
 Photograph of P. fuscipes

Salticidae genera
Salticidae
Spiders of Africa
Spiders of Asia
Spiders of North America